Melisa Bester, who performs as E^ST or East, is a South African-born Australian singer-songwriter and musician. She has released four extended plays, Old Age (2014), The Alley (September 2015), Get Money! (July 2016) and Life Ain't Always Roses (October 2018). Bester toured nationally as a support act for Twenty One Pilots in March–April 2016 and for Panic! at the Disco in October 2018. Her debut studio album, I'm Doing It, was released on 31 July 2020.

Biography
Melisa Bester was born in South Africa and moved to Australia's Central Coast as a child.

2014–2018: Career beginnings
Bester released her debut four-track extended play, Old Age, in July 2014. Dean Elphick of Happy Mag, described her first EP, "One thing that was evident on that debut was that she already sounded like a confident, established artist. Lots of people can sing well but it's obvious she has serious songwriting ability that stretch beyond her young years." In September 2015, she performed a mashup of "Bitter Sweet Symphony" and "Teardrop" for a Like a Version session on Triple J national radio. Her second four-track EP, The Alley, was issued in September 2015.

Bester collaborated with Jim Eliot on "Life Goes On" in 2017. On 27 July 2018, it was announced that she signed with rock label Fueled By Ramen. She was the opening act for Twenty One Pilots during the Australian leg of the Blurryface tour in March–April 2016. She also backed Panic! at the Disco local leg of the Pray for the Wicked tour in October 2018. She headlined her own tour in support of her fourth EP, Life Ain't Always Roses, which was released on 26 October 2018.

2019–present: I'm Doing It
In March 2020, Bester announced the release of her debut studio album, initially scheduling it for release on 12 June 2020. The album was preceding by the singles "Talk Deep" "Flight Path", "Fresh Out of Love", "Maybe It's Me" and "I Wanna Be Here". The album was later delayed and released on 31 July 2020.

Discography

Studio albums

Extended plays

Singles

As lead artist

As featured artist

Notes

Awards and nominations

National Live Music Awards
The National Live Music Awards (NLMAs) are a broad recognition of Australia's diverse live industry, celebrating the success of the Australian live scene. The awards commenced in 2016.

|-
| National Live Music Awards of 2020
| herself
| Musicians Making a Difference
| 
|-

Rolling Stone Australia Awards
The Rolling Stone Australia Awards are awarded annually in January or February by the Australian edition of Rolling Stone magazine for outstanding contributions to popular culture in the previous year.

! 
|-
|rowspan="2"| 2021
| I'm Doing It
| Best Record
| 
|rowspan="2"| 
|-
| E^ST
| Best New Artist
|

References

21st-century Australian women singers
Living people
Australian women pop singers
South African pop singers
Warner Records artists
21st-century South African women singers
Parlophone artists
Fueled by Ramen artists
Australian indie pop musicians
Electronica musicians
1998 births